James Eugene Hicks is an American former Negro league pitcher who played in the 1940s.

Hicks made his Negro leagues debut in 1940 with the Homestead Grays, and played for the New York Cubans the following season. In five recorded career appearances on the mound, he posted a 1–1 record over 15.1 innings.

References

External links
 and Seamheads

Year of birth missing
Place of birth missing
Homestead Grays players
New York Cubans players
Baseball pitchers